Nyisu or Yellow Yi 黄彝 is a Loloish language of Kunming, central Yunnan, China. There are fewer than 300 speakers remaining according to Bradley (2005, 2007). Nyisu speakers are also referred to as Doupo 都泼.

The Yellow Yi had originally migrated from Sichuan, and live in 4 villages in northwestern Fumin County (endangered) and one village in northwestern Anning, Yunnan (moribund, highly endangered). It is most closely related to Suondi Yi according to Bradley (2005). Nyisu was also documented by Lama (2012) in Luomian Township 罗免乡, Fumin County.

Pelkey (2011) tentatively classifies Nyisu of Shilin County as belonging to the Nisu language cluster. Nyisu of Gaohanshan Village, Zhuqing Township, Shilin County is documented in Wu Zili (1997) and YNYF (1984). It is not known whether Nyisu of Shilin and Nyisu of Kunming are closely related.

References

Sources 

 
 
 
 
 

Loloish languages
Languages of China